Hemistigma albipunctum, also known as the piedspot, is a species of dragonfly in the family Libellulidae.

Distribution
It is found in Angola, Botswana, Cameroon, Central African Republic, Chad, the Democratic Republic of the Congo, Ivory Coast, Equatorial Guinea, Ethiopia, Gambia, Ghana, Guinea, Kenya, Liberia, Madagascar, Malawi, Mozambique, Namibia, Nigeria, Senegal, Sierra Leone, South Africa, Tanzania, Togo, Uganda, Zambia, Zimbabwe, and possibly Burundi.

Habitat
Its natural habitats include open marsh and swamp in tropical Africa.

Description
It has a wingspan of 53 mm and is slender. There is a blue bloom on the body of the male, and a black streak across the front of the forewings. There are brown spots on the wingtips of females. It tends to fly over small ponds or streams, settling frequently.

Identification

References

Libellulidae
Taxonomy articles created by Polbot
Insects described in 1842